Simoma is a genus of flies in the family Tachinidae.

Species
S. grahami Aldrich, 1926

References

Exoristinae
Diptera of Asia
Tachinidae genera